The 2008 China Masters Super Series is the eleventh tournament of the 2008 BWF Super Series in badminton. It was held in Changzhou, China from September 23 to September 28, 2008.

Final Results

External links
China Masters Super Series 2008 at tournamentsoftware.com

China Open Super Series
China Masters
China Masters
Changzhou